Baş Daşağıl (also, Bash-Dashagil’ and Bash-Dashagyl) is a Lezgi  village and municipality in the Oghuz Rayon of Azerbaijan.  It has a population of 1,157.

References 

Populated places in Oghuz District